Pól Ó Dochartaigh (born 1961) is a professor of German and university vice-president.

Early life and studies
Ó Dochartaigh was born in Belfast, Northern Ireland, where he attended St. Mary's Christian Brothers' Grammar School, Belfast.  

He attended University College Cardiff, where he received a BA (Hons) in German in 1987, and continued with doctoral studies at the University of Nottingham, where he was awarded a PhD in German Literature in 1995.

Career
Ó Dochartaigh returned to Ireland  where he was appointed Professor of German, Dean of the Faculty of Arts, and Dean of the Confucius Institute for Northern Ireland, at the University of Ulster. He was awarded a BA (hons) in Irish Language and Literature from the University of Ulster in  2004.

He was appointed to the University of Galway, where, as of 2022, he holds the post of Registrar and Deputy President (Meabhránaí agus Uachtarán Ionaid).

Publications
 The Portrayal of Jews in GDR Prose Fiction (Amsterdam 1997)
 Julius Pokorny, 1887-1970: Germans Celts and Nationalism (Dublin 2003) 
 Germans and Jews since the Holocaust (Basingstoke 2015)

Awards
 Member, Royal Irish Academy
 Fellow, Royal Historical Society
 Fellow, Royal Society of Arts

Honours
 President, Association for German Studies in Great Britain and Ireland (2011–14) 
 Chair, Royal Irish Academy Committee for Modern Languages (2004-9)

References

1966 births
Living people
People educated at St. Mary's Christian Brothers' Grammar School, Belfast
Alumni of Cardiff University
Alumni of the University of Nottingham
Alumni of the University of Wales
Academics of the University of Galway